Russian cuisine is a collection of the different dishes and cooking traditions of the Russian people as well as a list of culinary products popular in Russia, with most names being known since pre-Soviet times, coming from all kinds of social circles.

History 

The history of Russian cuisine was divided in four groups: Old Russian cuisine (ninth to sixteenth century), Old Moscow cuisine (seventeenth century), the cuisine that existed during the ruling of Peter and Catherine the Great (eighteenth century), and finally Petersburg cuisine, which took place from the end of the eighteenth century to the 1860s. In the Old Russian period, the main food groups were bread, lots of grains, and lots of foods that contained starch. Women baked pies with lots of different fillings, such as mushrooms or berries. During gatherings, a loaf of bread and salt was always present. Kasha, such as buckwheat, oats, etc. were represented as wellbeing to the household. Lots of Russians used honey and  berries and made them into gingerbread, which to this day is a popular Russian dessert. Lots of current Russian cuisines were inspired from Asian cultures, such as pelmeni. In the seventeenth century, cuisine was separated based on economical class. The rich had meat and delicacies, such as caviar, while the poor had the most simple dishes. During this century, more food appeared, because new countries were annexed. During the Peter and Catherine the Great era, minced meat was incorporated into dishes and other European country's cuisine was also mixed into Russian foods. In the last era (Petersburg cuisine) lots of French, German, Dutch, and Italian meals were incorporated into Russian foods, such as lamb and pork. The French popularized potatoes and tomatoes in dishes. Due to the long lasting cold weather in Russia, many dishes were made to be preserved, so they would not have to take extra trips in the freezing snowy days.

Its foundations were laid by the peasant food of the rural population in an often harsh climate, with a combination of plentiful fish, pork, poultry, caviar, mushrooms, berries, and honey. Crops of rye, wheat, barley and millet provided the ingredients for a plethora of breads, pancakes, pies, cereals, beer and vodka.  Soups and stews are centered on seasonal or storable produce, fish and meats. Such food remained the staple for the vast majority of Russians well into the 20th century.

The 16th through 18th centuries brought more refined culinary techniques. It was during this time period that smoked meats and fish, pastry cooking, salads and green vegetables, chocolate, ice cream, wines, and juice were imported from abroad. At least for the urban aristocracy and provincial gentry, this opened the doors for the creative integration of these new foodstuffs with traditional Russian dishes.

In the early 20th century the Revolution saw a rapid decline of elite cuisine, driven both by the new egalitarian state ideology and by disappearance of the old Imperial elites who used to be its consumers. The distinct Soviet cuisine was born, emphasizing fusion of the Union's national cuisines, scientific approach to a diet, and industrial approach to food preparation and serving.

The fall of the Soviet Union saw the end of state monopoly on food service, and a corresponding diversification of cuisine. As average prosperity grew starting with the second decade after the collapse, so did the demand for fresh culinary experiences, prompting a renaissance of Imperial-era elite cuisine, as well as a wide search for novelty, local specialties, and creative reinterpretations, leading to the birth of what has been dubbed the New Russian cuisine.

Ethnic and regional variations and influences
The national Russian cuisine has evolved in a multicultural and multiethnic state, with strong mutual influence from the cuisines of other ethnic groups that live within the nation's borders or had been a part of the Russian state historically.

Despite such deep mutual influence, many national cuisines within the borders of the Russian Federation maintain their uniqueness, such as Tatar cuisine, Sakha cuisine, or Yamal cuisine.

The Russian cuisine itself is also geographically diverse, its variations dependent on raw materials and cooking methods available locally. In the north of Russia, it incorporates local berries such as cloudberry or crowberry, fish such as cod, game meat such as elk, or even edible moss known as yagel. Conversely, in Siberia it includes the local fish varieties, particularly those of the coregonus genus such as arctic cisco or muksun, and borrows the local cooking methods, to result in raw fish eaten frozen or combined with spices. Further east, local specialties are added such as eagle fern, kolomikta fruit, scallops and Kamchatka crabs.

Soups
Soups have always played an important role in Russian cuisine. The traditional staple of soups such as shchi, borscht, ukha, rassolnik, solyanka, botvinya, okroshka, and tyurya was enlarged in the 18th to 20th centuries by both European and Central Asian staples like clear soups, pureed soups, stews, and many others.

Russian soups can be divided into at least seven large groups:
 Chilled soups based on kvass, such as tyurya, okroshka, and botvinya.
 Light soups and stews based on water and vegetables, such as svekolnik. 
 Noodle soups with meat, mushrooms, or milk.
 Soups based on cabbage, most prominently shchi.
 Thick soups based on meat broth, with a salty-sour base like rassolnik and solyanka.
 Fish soups such as ukha.
 Grain- and vegetable-based soups.

Cold soups
Okroshka is a cold soup based on kvass or (less frequently) various kinds of sour milk; kefir is often preferred nowadays. Okroshka is also a salad. The main ingredients are two types of vegetables that can be mixed with cold boiled meat or fish in a 1:1 proportion. Thus vegetable, meat, poultry, and fish varieties of okroshka are made.

There are typically two types of vegetables in okroshka. The first must have a neutral taste, such as boiled potatoes, turnips, rutabagas, carrots, or fresh cucumbers. The second must be spicy and aromatic, like radishes or green onion as well as other herbs—greens of dill, parsley, chervil, celery, or tarragon. Different meat and poultry can be used in the same soup. The most common ingredient is beef alone or with poultry. A mild bologna-like sausage is sometimes used. If it is made with fish, the best choice would be tench, European perch, pike-perch, cod, or other neutral-tasting fish. In the coastal areas smoked and/or salted salmon is preferred instead, often in combination with other meats.

The kvass most commonly used in cooking is white okroshka kvass, which is much more sour than drinking kvass. Spices used include mustard, black pepper and pickled cucumber (specifically, the liquid from the pickles), solely or in combination. For the final touch, boiled eggs and smetana (similar to crème fraîche) are added. Often, the mustard, chopped hard-boiled yolks, pepper and pickle brine are combined into a spicy sauce that is added to the soup to taste.

For sour milk-based okroshka, well-shaken natural sour milk (often with the addition of seed oil) is used with the addition of pure water and ground garlic. Sometimes manufactured kefir is used instead of natural sour milk for time-saving reasons, though some say it detracts from the original taste of okroshka.

Tyurya is very similar to okroshka, the main difference being that instead of vegetables, bread, sometimes with addition of onion and vegetable oil, is soaked in kvass, similar to Silesian wodzionka or Portuguese açorda. It was commonly consumed during rough times (such as the Russian Revolution, World War I, and World War II) and by poor peasants. Also, due to its simplicity, it was very common as a meal during religious fasting.

Botvinya is another type of cold soup. The name of the soup comes from the Russian word botva, which means "leafy tops of root vegetables", and, true to its name, it is made with the leafy tops of young beets, as well as sorrel, scallions, dill, cucumbers, and two types of kvass. Mustard, garlic, and horseradish are then added for flavor. The vegetables are blanched, then rubbed through a sieve, and kvass is poured over them.

Svyokolnik (also known as kholodnik) is a cold borscht. It consists of beet sour or beet juice blended with sour cream, buttermilk, soured milk, kefir or yogurt. The mixture has a distinctive orange or pink color. It is served chilled, typically over finely chopped beetroot, cucumbers, radishes and spring onion, together with halved hard-boiled eggs and sprinkled with fresh dill. Chopped veal, ham, or crawfish tails may be added as well.

Hot soups
Shchi (cabbage soup) had been the predominant first course in Russian cuisine for over a thousand years. Shchi knew no social class boundaries, and even if the rich had richer ingredients and the poor made it solely of cabbage and onions, all these "poor" and "rich" variations were cooked in the same tradition. The unique taste of this cabbage soup was from the fact that after cooking it was left to draw (stew) in a Russian stove. The "spirit of shchi" was inseparable from a Russian izba (log hut). It can be eaten regularly, and at any time of the year.

The richer variant of shchi includes several ingredients, but the first and last components are a must:
 Cabbage.
 Meat (very rarely fish or mushrooms).
 Carrots, basil or parsley roots.
 Spicy herbs (onions, celery, dill, garlic, pepper, bay leaf).
 Sour components (smetana, apples, sauerkraut, pickle water).

When this soup is served, smetana is added. It is eaten with rye bread. Older tradition called for thickening shchi with a sort of roux, made by scalding a portion of the flour with a boiling broth, without frying it first, to increase the soup's caloric content, especially if the meat was not used; but about late XVIII century, and especially in the higher-class cooking, this was abandoned for the sake of the finer taste.
During much of the year when the Orthodox Christian Church prescribes abstinence from meat and dairy, a vegan version of shchi is made.
"Kislye" (sour) schi are made from pickled cabbage (sauerkraut), "serye" (grey) schi from the green outer leaves of the cabbage head. "Zelyonye" (green) schi are made from sorrel leaves, not cabbage, and used to be a popular summer soup.

Borscht is made of broth, beets, and tomatoes with various vegetables, including onions, cabbage, tomato, carrots, and celery. Borscht usually includes meat, particularly beef in Russia, and pork in Ukraine. Borscht is generally served very hot, with sour cream, chopped chives or parsley, and crushed garlic. Borscht is traditionally served with black bread. Borscht is associated as national cuisine in various different Eastern European countries such as Ukraine, Poland, Belarus, and Lithuania.

Ukha is a warm watery fish dish, however calling it a fish soup would not be absolutely correct. "Ukha" as a name for fish broth was established only in the late 17th to early 18th centuries. In earlier times this name was first given to thick meat broths, and then later chicken. Beginning from the 15th century, fish was more and more often used to prepare ukha, thus creating a dish that had a distinctive taste among soups.

A minimum of vegetables is added in preparation, and in classical cooking, ukha was simply a rich fish broth served to accompany fish pies (rasstegai, kuliebiaka, etc.). These days it is more often a fish soup, cooked with potatoes and other vegetables. A wide variety of freshwater fish is traditionally used.

Rassolnik is a hot soup in a salty-sour cucumber base. This dish formed in Russian cuisine quite late—only in the 19th century. About this time the name rassolnik was attached to it, originating from the Russian word rassol which means "brine" (pickle water). Pickle water was known to be used as a base for soups from the 15th century at the latest. Its concentration and ratio with other liquids and soup components gave birth to different soups: solyanka, shchi, and of course rassolnik. The latest is moderately sour-salty soups on pickled cucumber base. Some are vegetarian, but more often with products like veal or beef kidneys or all poultry giblets (stomach, liver, heart, neck, feet). For best taste, there has to be a balance between the sour part and neutral absorbers (cereals, potatoes, root vegetables).
Typical rassolnik is based on kidneys, brine (and pickles), vegetables and barley.

Kal'ya was a very common dish first served in the 16th–17th centuries. Subsequently, it almost completely disappeared from Russian cuisine. Often it was incorrectly called "fish rassolnik". The cooking technique is mostly the same as of ukha, but to the broth were added pickled cucumbers, pickle water, lemons and lemon juice, either separately or all together. The main characteristic of kal'ya is that only fat, rich fish was used; sometimes caviar was added along with the fish. More spices are added, and the soup turns out more piquant and thicker than ukha. Formerly kal'ya was considered a festivity dish.

Solyanka is a thick, piquant soup that combines components from shchi (cabbage, smetana) and rassolnik (pickle water and cucumbers), spices such as olives, capers, tomatoes, lemons, lemon juice, kvass, salted and pickled mushrooms make up a considerably strong sour-salty base of the soup. Solyanka is much thicker than other soups, about 1/3 less liquid ratio. Three types are distinguished: meat, fish, and simple solyanka. The first two are cooked on strong meat or fish broths, and the last on mushroom or vegetable broth. All the broths are mixed with cucumber pickle water.

Lapsha (noodle soup) was adopted by Russians from Tatars, and after some transformation became widespread in Russia. It comes in three variations: chicken, mushroom, and milk. Cooking all three is simple, including preparation of noodles, cooking of corresponding broth, and boiling of noodles in broth. Noodles are based on the same wheat flour or buckwheat/wheat flour mix. Mixed flour noodles go better with mushroom or milk broth.

Salads
Olivier salad (also known as Russian salad) is a mayonnaise-based potato salad distinguished by its diced texture and the contrasting flavors of pickles, hard-boiled eggs, boiled carrots, boiled potatoes, meat, and peas. This dish is one of the main features of New Year buffets.

 (from French ) is a salad made of boiled beets, potatoes, carrots, pickles, onions, sauerkraut, and sometimes peas or white beans. It is dressed with sunflower or olive oil.

Porridge
Porridge is one of the most important dishes in traditional Russian cuisine. The variety of cereals is based on the local variety of crops. In Russian, the word kasha refers to any kind of porridge.

The most popular cereals are buckwheat, millet, semolina, oats, barley, and rice. Traditionally, such cereal porridge is cooked in milk, especially if it is to be served for breakfast. Butter, salt, sugar, jams, fresh fruit and berries may be added.

Plain cooked porridges, especially buckwheat and rice, may be served as a side dish with other meals.

Canned meat, tushonka, is made with buckwheat/rice kasha traditions in mind, unlike the bully beef type of canned meat. While average-priced tushyonka contains a large portion of lard and jelly, this very non-meaty addition to meat can be used as a sauce for enriching rice or buckwheat kasha's taste.

Main dishes

Meat
In traditional Russian cuisine three basic variations of meat dishes can be highlighted:
 a large boiled piece of meat cooked in a soup or porridge, and then used as the second course or served cold (particularly in jellied stock such as kholodets, below)
 offal dishes (liver, tripe, etc.), baked in pots together with cereals;
 whole fowl dishes or parts of fowl (legs or breasts), or a large piece of meat (rump) baked on a baking tray in an oven, so-called "zharkoye" (from the word "zhar"(жар) meaning "heat")
at affluent households also mentions sausage-making, spit-roasted meats, stews and many other meat dishes.

As a garnish to meat dishes in the past the most common were porridges and cereals, in which the meat was boiled, later on boiled or rather steamed and baked root vegetables (turnips, carrots) as well as mushrooms; additionally the meat, without taking account its type, was garnished with pickled products—pickled cabbage, or sour and "soaked" (marinated) apples (mochoniye yabloki) or cranberries. Pan juices, alone or mixed with sour cream or melted butter, were used as gravy to pour on garnishing vegetables and porridges. Meat sauces, i.e. gravies based on flour, butter, eggs and milk, are not common for traditional Russian cuisine.

Pelmeni are a traditional Eastern European (mainly Russian) dish usually made with minced meat filling, wrapped in thin dough (made out of flour and eggs, sometimes with milk or water added). For filling, pork, lamb, beef, or any other kind of meat can be used; mixing several kinds is popular. The traditional Ural recipe requires the filling be made with 45% of beef, 35% of lamb, and 20% of pork. Traditionally, various spices, such as pepper, onions, and garlic, are mixed into the filling.

Russians seem to have learned to make pelmeni from Finno-Ugric people.  The word means "ear-shaped bread" in Finno-Ugric languages such as Udmurt and Komi; pel''' means 'ear' and n'an means 'bread'. In Siberia they were made in large quantities and stored safely frozen outside for several winter months.  In mainland Russia, the term "Siberian pel'meni" refers to pel'meni made with a mix of meats (whether the 45/35/20 mix mentioned above or another ratio), rather than a single meat. By the late 19th century, they became a staple throughout urban European Russia. They are prepared immediately before eating by boiling in water until they float, and then 2–5 minutes more. The resulting dish is served with butter or sour cream (mustard, horseradish, and vinegar are popular as well). Some recipes suggest frying pelmeni after boiling until they turn golden brown.

Pelmeni belong to the family of dumplings. They are akin to vareniki, a Ukrainian variety of dumplings with a filling made of, most commonly, mashed potatoes, farmer's cheese, or cherries. They are not dissimilar to Chinese potstickers, Tibetan mo-mo and Italian ravioli, as well as the manti of the Kazakh and Kyrgyz cultures.  The main difference between pelmeni and other kinds of dumplings is in their shape and size; the typical pelmen' is roughly spherical and is about 2 to 3 cm in diameter, whereas most other types of dumplings are usually elongated and much larger.

The process of making pelmeni is somewhat labor-intensive, but a pelmennitsa greatly speeds up the task. This device typically consists of a round aluminum plate with a matrix of holes surrounded by ridges. A sheet of dough is placed over the matrix, a filling is scooped into each "cell", and the dough sags under the weight of the filling, forming the body of the dumpling. Another sheet of dough is placed on top, and a wooden roller is rolled over the top, pressing the dough layers together, cutting the dumplings apart by the ridges, and forcing the dumplings to fall through the holes. Using a pelmennitsa, the chef can quickly manufacture batches of dumplings at a time.

Various minced meat dishes were adopted from other cuisines and became popular only in the nineteenth and twentieth centuries; for traditional Russian cuisine, they are not typical.Kotlety (minced cutlets) are pan-fried cutlet-shaped patties, not dissimilar from Salisbury steak and other such dishes. Kotlety are made from pork and beef, or from chicken, sometimes also from fish. In common recipes, ground meat, pork, onions and bread are put in a bowl and mixed thoroughly until it becomes relatively consistent. Once this effect is achieved, patties are formed and then put into a hot frying pan to cook. Pozharsky cutlet is a more elaborated version which was adopted by French haute cuisine.Beef Stroganoff: Sautéed pieces of beef served in a sauce with smetana (sour cream). From its origins in mid-19th-century Russia, it has become popular around the world, with considerable variation from the original recipe.Shashlyk is a form of shish kebab (marinated meat grilled on a skewer) popular in former Soviet Union countries, notably in Georgia, Russia, Armenia, Azerbaijan, and Uzbekistan. It often features alternating slices of meat and onions. Even though the word "shashlyk" was apparently borrowed from the Crimean Tatars by the Cossacks as early as the 18th century, kebabs did not reach Moscow until the late 19th century, according to Vladimir Gilyarovsky's "Moscow and Moscovites". From then on, their popularity spread rapidly; by the 1910s they were a staple in St. Petersburg restaurants and by the 1920s they were already a ubiquitous street food all over urban Russia. Shashlik is also used in Russia as a food to be cooked in an outdoor environment, similarly to barbecue in English-speaking countries.Kholodets (or studen): Jellied chopped pieces of pork or veal meat with some spices added (pepper, parsley, garlic, bay leaf) and minor amounts of vegetables (carrots, onions). The meat is boiled in large pieces for long periods of time, then chopped, boiled a few times again and finally chilled for 3–4 hours (hence the name) forming a jelly mass, though gelatin is not used because calves' feet, pigs' heads and other such offal is gelatinous enough on its own. It is served with horseradish, mustard, or ground garlic with smetana.

Fish
Fish was important in pre-revolutionary cuisine, especially on Russian Orthodox fast days when meat was forbidden, similar to the Catholic custom of eating fish instead of meat on Fridays.  Strictly freshwater fish such as carp and sudak (Sander lucioperca, Zander) were commonly eaten in inland areas, as well as anadromous sturgeon and in northern areas salmon, pike and trout.  A greater variety of fish—including saltwater species—were preserved by salting, pickling or smoking and consumed as "zakuski" (hors d'oeuvres).

 Selyodka pod shuboi (Dressed herring)

There is a dish in modern Russian cuisine resembling a mix of "svekolnik" and pickled herring: selyodka pod shuboi, literally "[fur]coated (dressed) herring", where pickled herring is coated with a layer of potatoes, a layer of mayo and/or smetana sour cream, with grated beet added on top for coating (hence "fur"-coat" word, shuba).

Vegetables
Cabbage, potatoes, and cold tolerant greens are common in Russian and other Eastern European cuisines.  Pickling cabbage (sauerkraut), cucumbers, tomatoes and other vegetables in brine is used to preserve vegetables for winter use. Pickled apples and some other fruit also used to be widely popular. These are sources of vitamins during periods when fresh fruit and vegetables are traditionally not available.

Desserts and pastries

The earliest form of the honey bread was made with just rye flour, honey and berry juice, arriving in Russia by way of Egypt in the 9th century. Later preparations dating to the 12th and 13th centuries included spices purchased in the markets of India and the Middle east. Tula gingerbread is known as early as 1685, and was historically made by well-known confectioners with gingerbread molds hand carved into planks of wood taken from local birch and pear trees.Pirozhki (singular: pirozhok; diminutive of pirog [pie]) are small stuffed buns (pies) made of either yeast dough or short pastry. They are filled with one of many different fillings and are either baked (the ancient Slavic method) or shallow-fried (known as "priazhenie", this method was borrowed from the Tatars in the 13th century). One feature of pirozhki that sets them apart from, for example, English pies is that the fillings used are almost invariably fully cooked. The use of chopped hard-boiled eggs in fillings is another interesting feature. Six typical fillings for traditional pirozhki are:

 Chopped boiled meat mixed with sautéed onions
 Rice and boiled eggs with dill
 Fish sautéed with onions and mixed with hard-boiled chopped eggs and rice
 Mashed potatoes mixed with dill and green onion
 Sautéed cabbage
 Sautéed mushrooms with onions and sometimes carrots

Polish pierogi (type: dumplings) are not really related to Russian "pirogi" (type: pies) and "pirozhki" (type: buns, small pies)Blin are thin griddle cakes similar to crepes traditionally made with buckwheat flour and yeasted batter, although non-yeasted batter has become widespread in recent times. They may be topped or filled with butter, smetana (sour cream), fruit preserves or caviar. Blini are often served in connection with Maslenitsa (Масленица, Butter Week; also known as Pancake Week), a springtime religious festival celebrated before Lent, but it is also a common breakfast dish. The word "blin" (singular of blini) comes from Old Slavic "mlin", which means "to mill".

Blin had a somewhat ritual significance for early Slavic peoples in pre-Christian times since they were a symbol of the sun, due to their round form. They were traditionally prepared at the end of the winter to honor the rebirth of the new sun during Maslenitsa. This tradition was adopted by the Orthodox Church and is carried on to the present day, as the last week of dairy and egg products before Lent. Bliny are still often served at wakes, to commemorate the recently deceased. Blini can be made from wheat, buckwheat, or other grains, although wheat blini are most popular in Russia. 
The word "blin" is also often used as a soft curse word, expressing frustration. This practice originates from the word's phonetic similarity to the much more vulgar word "Blyádt".Syrniki are fried curd fritters, garnished with sour cream, jam, honey or applesauce.Vatrushka is a kind of cake with a ring of dough and tvorog (cottage cheese) in the middle, often with raisins or bits of fruit, from about five inches to two and a half feet in diameter.Kulich' is a kind of Easter bread that is traditional in the Orthodox Christian faith and is eaten in countries like Russia, Belarus, Ukraine, Bulgaria, Romania, Georgia, Moldova, North Macedonia and Serbia.

Traditionally after the Easter service, the kulich, which has been put into a basket and decorated with colorful flowers, is blessed by the priest. Blessed kulich is eaten before breakfast each day. Any leftover kulich that is not blessed is eaten with Paskha for dessert.

Kulich is baked in tall, cylindrical tins (like coffee or fruit juice tins). When cooled, kulich is decorated with white icing (which slightly drizzles down the sides) and colorful flowers. Historically, it was often served with cheese paska bearing the symbol XB (from the traditional Easter greeting of Христос воскресе, "Christ is Risen").

Kulich is only eaten between Easter and Pentecost.

The recipe for kulich is similar to that of Italian panettone.Paskha is a festive dish made in Eastern Orthodox countries which consists of food that is forbidden during the fast of Great Lent. It is made during Holy Week and then brought to Church on Great Saturday to be blessed after the Paschal Vigil. The name of the dish comes from Pascha, the Eastern Orthodox celebration of Easter.

Cheese paskha is a traditional Easter dish made from quark (curd cheese), which is white, symbolizing the purity of Christ, the Paschal Lamb, and the joy of the Resurrection. It is formed in a mould, traditionally in the shape of a truncated pyramid (a symbol of the Church; this form is also said to represent the Tomb of Christ). It is usually served as an accompaniment to a rich Easter bread called paska in Ukrainian and kulich in Russian.

The pascha is decorated with traditional religious symbols, such as the "Chi Ro" motif, a three-bar cross, and the letters X and B (Cyrillic letters which stands for Христосъ Воскресе. This is the Slavonic form of the traditional Paschal greeting: "Christ is Risen!"). All of these religious decorations symbolize Christ's Passion and Resurrection.Varenye is a dessert and condiment. It is made from cooking fruits or berries. It is similar to jam except that fruits are not macerated and the consistency is more akin to fruit within syrup. It is used as a topping for crepes and syrniki and as a sweetener for tea. It is also eaten on its own as a sweet.Pastila is a fruit confectionery (pâte de fruits). It has been described as "small squares of pressed fruit paste" and "light, airy puffs with a delicate apple flavor". In Imperial Russia, the "small jellied sweetmeats" were served for tea "with a white foamy top, a bit like marshmallow, but tasting of pure fruit". In its modern form it is essentially fruit meringue, but baked to a soft, not crisp consistency. Unlike its derivative zefir, true pastila does not use gelling agents and has a much lower egg white content.Zefir (may also be spelled zephyr or zephir) is a type of soft confectionery made by whipping fruit and berry purée (mostly apple puree) with sugar and egg whites with subsequent addition of a gelling agent like pectin, carrageenan, agar, or gelatine. It is commonly produced and sold in the countries of the former Soviet Union. The name given after the Greek god of the light west wind Zephyr symbolizes its delicate airy consistency.

Zefir is somewhat similar in its consistency to marshmallows, Schokokuss or krembo. It is derived from the traditional Russian pastila but with added egg white foam and a gelling agent. The form typically resembles traditional meringue. However, in contrast to commercial meringue, it is never crisp. It is usually of white or rose color.

Chocolate-coated versions are also widespread. In contrast to the other chocolate-coated marshmallow-like confectioneries they normally do not include a biscuit layer.Kissel or kisel is a viscous fruit dish, popular as a dessert and as a drink.Encyclopedia of Contemporary Russian Culture (2013), page 73 It consists of the sweetened juice of berries, like mors, but it is thickened with cornstarch, potato starch or arrowroot; sometimes red wine or fresh or dried fruits are added. It is similar to the Danish rødgrød and German Rote Grütze. Swedish blåbärssoppa is a similarly prepared bilberry dessert, although only fresh or frozen bilberries, not dried berries are used to prepare it.

Kissel can be served either hot or cold, also together with sweetened quark or semolina pudding. Kissel can also be served on pancakes or with ice cream. If the kissel is made using less thickening starch, it can be drunk—this is common in Russia and Ukraine.

Beverages

Many traditional drinks are indigenous to Russia and are not present in other national cuisines. The most notable of these are vodka, sbiten', kvass, medovukha and mors. Many of them are no longer common and have been replaced by drinks originating in Europe. Nonetheless, these beverages were formerly drunk as a complement to meat and poultry dishes, sweet porridge, and dessert. Of particular note is sbiten, an immensely popular medieval drink which has since been replaced by tea as the Russian mainstay beverage.

Alcoholic

Of Russia's alcoholic beverages, perhaps the most ancient is Medovukha, a sweet, low-alcohol drink, made with fermented honey with the addition of various spices. A stronger honey-based beverage, stavlenniy myod, also exists in Russia and is broadly equivalent to Scandinavian mead; it is typically made with the admixture of berry juices.

Vodka is the best known of Russia's alcoholic products and is produced, with some variation, throughout the country. Vodka can be either grain or potato based and is frequently flavored with a great variety of ingredients ranging from hot-pepper and horseradish to fruits and berries.

Beer has been manufactured in Russia since at the very least the 9th century. Its popularity was for many centuries concentrated in the Lands of Novgorod. Beer continued to be made throughout Russian history, but real growth came in the 18th century when many breweries were founded in order to supply the newly modernized and expanded the imperial army and fleet. A real explosion in the popularity of beer came in the last decades of the Soviet Era and has continued into the present day, with Russia now ranking as the fourth largest producer in the world.

Wine is manufactured in the southern regions in the country but lags far behind other alcoholic beverages in popularity. The wine industry, which was somewhat notable in imperial times, is slowly expanding, but most Russians that drink wine tend to prefer imported foreign varieties, especially sweet varieties produced in the countries of the former USSR and little known in the outside world.

Non-alcoholic
Most non-alcoholic Russian drinks are based on fruits and berries. Those include kompot, made by boiling fruit with sweetened water; uzvar, in which dried fruit is used instead; mors, made of berries such as lingonberry, cranberry, blueberries, or raspberries; and kisel, a viscous fruit drink thickened with cornstarch, potato starch or arrowroot.

Kvass is an ancient and still widely popular bread-based drink. The basic method of preparing kvass includes water, flour and liquid malt; these ingredients are used to make a dough that is subjected to fermentation. This results in a beverage with very low alcohol content. Commercial kvass is often around 0.5% alcohol. The fermented liquid, referred to as "zator", is diluted with water and mixed with yeast, sugar, and aromatic additives. This final mixture is allowed to brew for several days. Flavor additives may include fruit and berry juices (cherry, raspberry, lemon, etc.), as well as ginger and mint.

Sbiten, another non-alcoholic drink, is made of honey, water, fruit juices, and spices. Sbiten was once the most popular non-alcoholic beverage in the country, but in the last few centuries, it has been superseded and largely replaced by tea and coffee.

Tea is by far the most common drink in almost all parts of Russia. First introduced from China in the 17th century, its popularity has since spread throughout the country. Black tea has always been the dominant variety, but after the Russian acquisition of Central Asia, awareness of and interest in green tea began to increase slowly. Today Russia remains one of the largest tea consumers in the world. Russian Caravan is perhaps the most well-known type of Russian tea around the world.

Until the Sino-Soviet split, tea was mostly brought in from China. Now, Russia imports most of its tea from India and Sri Lanka, with Darjeeling being the most prized variety. Domestic cultivation exists in the southern regions of the country (mostly in Krasnodar Krai), but local supply is very limited compared to national consumption.

Coffee is also popular but has never caught up to tea in popularity. Peter the Great is credited with introducing coffee to Russia, with the drink becoming steadily more pervasive since that time. Coffee is commonly made either using the Turkish or common European methods.

Gallery

See also

 A Gift to Young Housewives'', a well-known 19th-century Russian cookbook
 List of Russian dishes
 List of Russian desserts
 List of Russian restaurants
 Pirog
 Soviet cuisine

References

Further reading

External links

 Authentic Russian Recipes, Cuisine and Cooking
 Blog about Russian cuisine
 Russian cuisine restaurants outside of Russia
 Articles about Russian cuisine with recipes
 The best New Year's recipes from Russia Irakli Iosebashvili, 16 December 2009, Russia Beyond the Headlines
 Food shopping in Russia

 
Arctic cuisine